Amanush (also spelt as Amanus) is a 2010 Indian Bengali-language romantic thriller drama film written and directed by Rajib Biswas, starring Soham Chakraborty and Srabanti Chatterjee in lead roles, whilst newcomer Rehaan Roy, Saswata Chatterjee play supporting roles. The film, which has music scored by noted musician Jeet Ganguly and cinematography handled by Kumud Verma, released in April 2010. The film is officially a remake of the 2003 film Kaadhal Kondein starring Dhanush and Sonia Agarwal. This film was already remade in Bangladesh as Onno Manush in 2004.

The story explores the mind of a youth who is mentally and physically abused in his childhood. The lack of a mother's love haunts the protagonist throughout the film as the girl of his infatuation parts him in her death. Turning into a psychopath, he desperately tries to woo his newly found lady love.

Plot
Vinod (Soham Chakraborty), who orphaned at an early age, has grown up under the care of a church father, Father Rozario (Nagesh), in North Bengal, is an introvert but a genius. He is forcibly sent to college by Father Rozario but is a complete misfit in class. One day he solves a complex mathematics problem in class surprising his classmates. Though shunned and avoided by the rest of his class, a beautiful and educated young girl, Ria (Srabanti Chatterjee) becomes his friend and he gradually warms up to her too. Impressed by Ria's heavenly beauty and charm, his feelings soon turn into love but he realizes that Ria considers him as only a friend. But he is unwilling to let her go. Meanwhile, Vinod learns that Ria is in love with another classmate, Aditya (Rehaan Roy).

Ria's father is angered on learning about her love. He shuts her up and prevents her from contacting anyone. But Vinod comes and meets her on the pretext of getting some old clothes for himself to wear. Pitied by Vinod, her father allows him. But Vinod uses the chance and escapes with Ria. He convinces her that she will meet Aditya.

Vinod has set up a secret place for executing his plan of wooing Ria. He makes her stay with him, while convincing her by talking about the never-impending Aditya's arrival. On one such day, he reveals his miserable past, where he is made to work for paid labour after being orphaned at an early age. He revolts against the oppression one day against the illegal child labour in vogue at his place. Promptly he is beaten black and blue for his profanity. Moreover, he also loses his girlfriend to rapists in that place, who also kill her. Somehow he manages to escape from them and seeks refuge in the place of Father Rozario.

Ria is really touched by his past. Incidentally the police and Aditya arrive at the place. While Vinod was away to get some food, they try to make Ria understand that Vinod was a psychopath. Yet Ria scoffs at their claims, citing his gentlemanly behaviour over the days she was put up alone with him. Vinod, learning that the police have arrived at the scene, begins to indulge in mass violence. He opens fire, killing a police constable. Forcing them out of their hideout, he manages to evade the police Inspector and Aditya and successfully brings Ria back to their original place of stay.

Ria soon identifies the tiger out of the cow's skin. Vinod pleads with her, telling her that all he wanted in his life was her presence with him. But Ria called him a friend and stated her inability to accept him as her partner for life.

Meanwhile, Aditya regains consciousness and comes back to attack Vinod and rescue his girlfriend. A violent fight follows, where Vinod defies his puny self and treats Aditya with disdain. The fight culminates with Vinod, Aditya and Ria finding themselves at the edge of a cliff.

While Ria clutches a tree bark tightly, Vinod and Aditya slip out and barely manage to hold either of her hands. Ria is forced to a situation where she needs to choose between her boyfriend and friend. Aditya's pleas notwithstanding, Ria doesn't have the heart to kill Vinod. The epic of a cliffhanger finally ends with Vinod smiling wryly at Ria and letting go of her hands himself. He falls dead into the deep valley.

Cast
 Soham Chakraborty as Vinod, a psychopath
 Srabanti Chatterjee as Riya, Aditya's love interest
 Rehaan Roy as Aditya
 Rita Koiral, the main antagonist, the child trafficking kingpin.
 Biswajit Chakraborty as Police Commissioner and Riya's father
 Saswata Chatterjee as ACP Raghav Roy
 Dolon Roy as Riya's mother

Critical reception
Amrita Roychowdhury of The Times of India commented "Oh my love, Jeet Gannguli has done it again — giving the much-needed hype that Amanush needed when pitted against another big budget release of the week. When it comes to acting, Soham is a real revelation. It is a treat watching him play an underdog for which he also gathers complete sympathy from the crowd. The actor has some calibre to pull off a scene (or the film in this case) all by himself. He can convincingly play the sweet, ugly and psychotic killer — at the same time and without overdoing it.And finally, a word on the director. Considering that this is Rajib's second film, the director has told a gripping story."

Box office
The film grossed   at the box office.

Soundtrack

Sequel
'Amanush 2'

References

External links
 

2010 films
Bengali-language Indian films
2010s Bengali-language films
2010 thriller drama films
Films scored by Jeet Ganguly
Bengali remakes of Tamil films
Indian thriller drama films
Films directed by Rajiv Kumar Biswas
2010 drama films